is a railway station on the Minobu Line of Central Japan Railway Company (JR Central) located in the town of Shōwa, Nakakoma District, Yamanashi Prefecture, Japan.

Lines
Jōei Station is served by the Minobu Line and is located 78.9 kilometers from the southern terminus of the line at Fuji Station.

Layout
Jōei Station has one island platform connected to the station building by a level crossing. The station is unattended.

Platforms

Adjacent stations

History
The station was renamed to its present name on October 1, 1938. The line came under control of the Japanese Government Railways on May 1, 1941. The JGR became the JNR (Japan National Railway) after World War II. The station has been unattended since June 1983. Along with the division and privatization of JNR on April 1, 1987, the station came under the control of the Central Japan Railway Company.

Surrounding area
 Jōei Elementary School
Kokubo Industrial Park

See also
 List of railway stations in Japan

External links

   Minobu Line station information 

Railway stations in Japan opened in 1928
Railway stations in Yamanashi Prefecture
Minobu Line
Shōwa, Yamanashi